Cheezels are a brand of Australian snack food currently produced by Snack Brands Australia. Made from corn and rice, they are a crisp puffy ring with a strong, savoury cheddar cheese flavour and aroma. They are similar in texture to cheese puffs, American Cheetos, or Canadian Cheezies.

In some countries they are distributed by Laura Matte (which since 2016 has been owned by Universal Robina Corporation, and previously by The Real McCoy Snackfood Company). In Malaysia, Cheezels were originally produced by Danone and later by Kraft Foods, and are currently owned by Mondelēz International, together with Twisties. In New Zealand, Cheezels are owned by Bluebird Foods Ltd and PepsiCo subsidiaries.

History

According to any modern packet of Cheezels, the snack entered the market in 1971. Company folklore has it that the creative team were stuck for a name when the boss chipped in with "Just call 'em Cheezels".

As of 2017 Cheezels are gluten free.

Flavours
Usually, Cheezels are made from corn and rice, and many kinds of powdered cheeses. Other flavours of the snack have been produced by Snack Brands Australia, such as:
Original Cheese
Pizza
Smokin' BBQ
Cheese & Bacon - also previously known as Rashers Cheese & Bacon
Hoops & Crosses Burger Flavoured - cheeseburger-flavoured Cheezels shaped like the Xs and Os in the game tic-tac-toe 
Minis - miniature versions of Cheezels
Chilli Cheese

International variants

Italy

In Italy, Cheezels are known under the name Yonkers, also owned by Mondelēz International. The snack has no slogan, and features a mascot named "Yonky", after the snack. The snack is much less cylindrical than its Australian counterpart, shaped more like the Australian Burger Ring, and is less puffy. For seasoning, Yonkers uses a less tangy, finer cheese powder than that of Cheezels, but with a relatively similar aftertaste. Yonkers' aroma is more pungent, and relies on the same child-friendly gimmick of Cheezels by popularising using them as rings to wear on your fingers.

The ingredients for Yonkers are as follows, in order of percentage of product: corn grit 61.7%, palm oil, cheese powder 6.2%, whey powder, salt, flavouring, dried yeast, emulsifier (mono- and diglycerides of fatty acids (E471)), yeast extract, flavour enhancers (E621, E627, E631), lactose (from milk), dye (carotenes).

See also
 Twisties
 Cheetos

References

Australian snack foods
Snack Brands Australia brands
Products introduced in 1971
Mondelez International brands